D 94, also known as King Salman bin Abdulaziz Al Saud Street, Jumeirah Road or Jumeirah Beach Road, and formerly Al Sufouh Road is a road in Dubai, United Arab Emirates.  The road runs parallel to Dubai's coast along the Persian Gulf and along E 11 (Sheikh Zayed Road), connecting the sub-localities of Jumeirah (Jumeirah 1, 2 and 3). Once it enters the locality of Al Sufouh, D 94 becomes known as King Salman bin Abdulaziz Al Saud Street.  It originates near Dubai Maritime City and the Dubai Dry Docks; and terminates after Jumeirah Beach Residence by turning south and merging with the Sheikh Zayed Road.

Important landmarks along D 94 include Dubai Dry Docks, Jumeirah Grand Mosque, Mercato Mall, Dubai Zoo, Jumeirah Beach Hotel, Wild Wadi Water Park, Burj Al Arab, Madinat Jumeirah and Palm Jumeirah.

The Jumeirah section of the road underwent a beautification and expansion project in the early 2000s which added another lane on both the directions of the road; and increased the greenery and barriers on the road medians.

The Al Sufouh Tramway is being built along this route to connect Jumeirah and Umm Suqeim with the rest of the Dubai Metro network.

The road was renamed in September 2016 from Al Sufouh Road to King Salman bin Abdulaziz Al Saud Street in honor of the Saudi Arabian King Salman's contributions to the wider Arab world.

References
Roads in the United Arab Emirates
Transport in Dubai